The 2008 American Indoor Football Association season is the league's fourth overall season.  The league champions were the Florence Phantoms, who defeated the Wyoming Cavalry in AIFA Championship Bowl II.

Standings

 Green indicates clinched playoff berth
 Purple indicates division champion
 Grey indicates best league record

Playoffs

AIFA Championship Bowl II: Located at the Florence Civic Center in Florence, South Carolina on Friday, July 25

External links
 2008 AIFA stats

American Indoor Football Association seasons
2008 in American football